The New Jersey Bell Headquarters Building is located in Newark, Essex County, New Jersey, United States. The building was built in 1929 by the New Jersey Bell Telephone Company and was added to the National Register of Historic Places on September 21, 2005. The art deco building was designed by Ralph Thomas Walker of the architectural firm Voorhees, Gmelin, and Walker. The buff brick and sandstone façade is decorated with pilasters created by sculptor Edward McCartan. Since the building's opening, soft orange lights have bathed its upper floors at night. The building later became headquarters for Verizon New Jersey, Inc.

The building was sold in 2017 and has been converted to residential high-rise market rate apartments and renamed Walker House. Verizon still leases several floors in the building. It opened in 2019 as the Walker House, named for the architect who designed it.

The Cory Booker 2020 presidential campaign opened in the building in March 2019.

See also
National Register of Historic Places listings in Essex County, New Jersey
List of tallest buildings in Newark

References

Apartment buildings in Newark, New Jersey
Art Deco architecture in New Jersey
Buildings and structures in Newark, New Jersey
Commercial buildings on the National Register of Historic Places in New Jersey
National Register of Historic Places in Newark, New Jersey
New Jersey Register of Historic Places
Office buildings completed in 1929
Residential skyscrapers in Newark, New Jersey
Skyscraper office buildings in Newark, New Jersey
Telecommunications buildings on the National Register of Historic Places